Isabelle Gautheron (born 3 December 1963) is a French former cyclist. She competed in the women's sprint event at the 1988 Summer Olympics.

References

External links
 

1963 births
Living people
French female cyclists
Olympic cyclists of France
Cyclists at the 1988 Summer Olympics
Sportspeople from Villeneuve-Saint-Georges
Cyclists from Île-de-France